Farangi is a 1964 Pakistani Urdu film. It is directed by Khalil Qaiser and written by Riaz Shahid. The film stars Sudhir, Shamim Ara and Agha Talish with Bahar Begum and Allauddin. Set in 1910s and 1920s at the time of British Raj, Farangi revolves around the battle of a Pashtun freedome fighter against the british army. The film was a golden jubilee success and features some memorable poems by Faiz Ahmad Faiz and Sahir Ludhianvi, with music was composed by Rashid Attre. Ara and Talish's performances in the film were praised. At Nigar Awards 1964, it received four awards including Best Actress for Ara.

Plot 

At the time of British Raj, Akbar who hails from tribal areas goes to his house for a week's leave. On arrival, his mother tells him that she has fixed her marriage with Zeba. He first refuses to marry her because he loves Gul, but later agrees when he comes across Nadir Khan, who also wants to marry her. At his return to the army's fort,  the Major of the army compels him to assist them in attacking at his village but he rebels, manages to escape and start disrupting their plans. In the army's attack, Zeba and her son survive but Gul goes blind.

Many years pass away and Akbar, now a rebellious fighter who kills the army's soldiers one day comes across Gul by chance. When she learns that he is fighting against the enemy, she decides to help him in every possible way. They meet in the cave where Gul regularly informs him about the situations.

When army's Major comes to know that the rebellious fighter who is killing their soldiers is Akbar, he kidnaps Gul and her father. He asks Akbar's address but she doesn't tell anything. They kill her father and she herself suffers a lot but doesn't tell.

On the other hand, Nadir Khan who works for British army kills Zeba when she tries to save Saleem, her son. Saleem escapes but again meets with Nadir Khan who brings him in his house where his mother lives. Nadir Khan's mother who is a determined Pashtun lady, kills her own son when he tries to kill Akbar. There, she gathers the villagers and said them to stand by Akbar Khan as he is fighting fir their freedom.

After Nadir Khan's death, the Major imprisons his mother and demand the release of his officer which Akbar has arrested. When Major comes to receive his officer he surprises to know that Akbar Khan is not alone. He goes to the fort where Akbar also follows him along with the villagers who fight the army, defeat them and Akbar kills the Major.

Cast 

 Sudhir as Akbar Khan
 Shamim Ara as Gul
 Agha Talish as Major of British army
 Bahar Begum as Zeba
 Allauddin
 Mazhar Shah
 Saqi
 Safia Moini

Soundtrack and music 

The music of the film was composed by Rashid Attre while lyrics were penned by Faiz Ahmed Faiz, Sahir Ludhianvi and Qateel Shifai.

Track listing

Release and box office 

Farangi was released on 18 December 1964 and ran for 25 weeks in the theaters of Karachi, thus became a golden Jubilee success.

Awards 

Farangi received 4 Nigar Awards in the following categories:

References

External links 

 

1964 films
Pakistani historical drama films
1960s Urdu-language films
Urdu-language Pakistani films
Films set in the British Raj
Films set in the 1910s
Films set in the 1920s
Films scored by Rashid Attre
Nigar Award winners